Unlike neighboring England and Scotland, there were few witchcraft accusations and trials in Wales throughout the 1500s to mid-1700s, and most of the accused were acquitted. Only five people were executed in Wales for witchcraft during this period.

Historical background 
Witchcraft in early modern Wales was common, and superstitious beliefs and rituals were involved in everyday life. Accusations, trials, and executions were significantly fewer in number than in England, Scotland, and other parts of Europe, with only 37 prosecutions in Wales during this time period. England, during the same time period, is believed to have executed 500 people for witchcraft. In addition, most cases in Wales were dismissed or acquitted, and punishment was often less severe than in many other places where torture was common. According to historian Richard Suggett, contemporary English sources claimed a belief that different types of magic were used in Wales at this time, both harmful and helpful. Although, during early times, witchcraft was not always considered bad, during the later middle ages, beliefs associated with the practice of magic and witchcraft changed, as it was seen as being associated with the devil, and any sort of witchcraft was eventually made illegal.

Witchcraft laws 
The Acts of Union from 1536-1543 brought Wales under English rule, but Wales' lack of legal consequences through harsh punishments and executions, as well as the deference to the criminal Courts of Great Sessions instead of church courts, in Welsh witchcraft cases indicates that Wales still followed the authority of older Welsh customary laws rather than English law. Pre-union Welsh law emphasized compensation of the victim, rather than punitive punishment of the accused, to ensure a peaceful outcome between all participants and to keep harmony in the community.

English witchcraft acts during the early modern era 
In 1542, under Henry VIII, parliament passed the Witchcraft Act of 1541, that was later repealed under Edward VI. This act deemed witchcraft a crime punishable by death.

In 1563, under Elizabeth I, the Witchcraft Act of 1541 was restored as the Witchcraft Act of 1563, but the death penalty was only sought when harm was caused by witchcraft. 

In 1604, under James I, the 1563 Act was repealed, and the new 1604 Act included different types of punishment for different crimes that were not considered as harmful as others. This law dictated that a guilty person should be imprisoned and suffer pillory for a first offense and death for a second. After the 1563 and 1604 Acts, the church no longer administered witch trials, as this was transferred to the courts.  

In 1735, under George II, it became a crime to claim that someone else was practicing witchcraft or in the possession of magic powers. This 1735 Act repealed all previous acts and ended the hunt for witches and executions for witchcraft. The maximum penalty after this was one year in prison.

Trials, accusations, and prosecutions 
{
  "type": "FeatureCollection",
  "features": [
    {
      "type": "Feature",
      "properties": {},
      "geometry": {
        "type": "Point",
        "coordinates": [
          -3.3368616155348723,
          53.17543101966099
        ]
      }
    },
    {
      "type": "Feature",
      "properties": {},
      "geometry": {
        "type": "Point",
        "coordinates": [
          -4.273180303280243,
          53.140065739696595
        ]
      }
    },
    {
      "type": "Feature",
      "properties": {},
      "geometry": {
        "type": "Point",
        "coordinates": [
          -4.094390830141492,
          53.263359361026005
        ]
      }
    },
    {
      "type": "Feature",
      "properties": {},
      "geometry": {
        "type": "Point",
        "coordinates": [
          -3.343882305489388,
          53.32230258406598
        ]
      }
    }
  ]
}  
During the 16th and 17th centuries, there were only 37 witchcraft prosecutions in Wales. This is relatively few, when compared to the rest of Western Europe, which totaled 200,000 executions between the mid 15th to the mid 18th century. Out of these 37 suspects, only 8 were found guilty and only 5 received a death sentence, with the remainder more than likely being acquitted. All of the cases, according to Welsh Historian Kelsea Rees with Liverpool Hope University, took place in northern Wales. Multiple witchcraft cases were very close to the northern part of the Anglo-Welsh border.

Executions 
In 1594, in Llandyrnog, Gwen ferch Ellis, 42, was the first person to be executed as a witch in Wales. The accusations were that, although she otherwise was known to provide healing, she had turned to do evil. These accusations were based on a charm that was found to be written backwards, and this was thought to be an example of the act of bewitching. After the trial, she was sentenced to death.

In 1622, in Caernarfon, a trio of witches, all from the same family, were found guilty and ultimately executed. The trio consisted of three siblings: Lowri ferch Evan, Agnes ferch Evan, and Rhydderch ap Evan, a yeoman. The cause of their trial was over the death of the wife of a man from the local gentry, Margaret Hughes, and the bewitchment of their daughter, Mary. Margaret was already sick and, according to today's medical knowledge, Mary's so called "bewitchment" was more likely the symptoms of a stroke due to the lameness of her left arm, feet, and the complete loss of her voice due to loss of function in her tongue.

In 1655, in Beaumaris, Wales, Margaret ferch Richard was accused of witchcraft. She was a widow in her mid-to-late 40s and was considered a charmer. She was also believed to have caused the death of another woman, Gwen Meredith, who was ill prior to her untimely death. Margaret was convicted in accordance with the 1604 Witchcraft Act and sentenced to death by hanging.

Acquittals 
In 1655, in Llanasa, Flintshire, Wales, another trial took place. Dorothy Griffith was accused of bewitching a traveling seaman, William Griffith. William claimed to have seen Dorothy in front of him with lights around her, and having led him to an ale house. He claimed to have looked out over the sea and saw that it on fire and became frightened by the experience. He further was believed to have fallen into a trance or lost consciousness but recovered. Dorothy was detained for 7 weeks but was able to gather signatures from other locals, in which they stated they had never had reason to believe there was any relationship between Dorothy and witchcraft. It was rumored that the relationship between the two families was tense and that William had been ill. Although Dorothy appeared at trial, it is believed that the case was eventually dismissed, and she was never sentenced. The case of Dorothy Griffith is one of 32 cases that were acquitted.

Early modern beliefs about witchcraft 
Blessings were the act of protecting oneself or others from anything evil; they were considered part of everyday life during the early modern period. It was believed that good or evil could come to a person based on whether or not they had received a blessing. If someone did something that was considered to be unacceptable by the society in which they lived, it was important to seek a blessing in order to avoid some form of punishment. A curse, however, would often be done in order to inflict misfortune on someone's family or property. Formal cursing was the practice of involving God and hexing the wrongdoer, often on the knees with arms stretched toward Heaven. When someone had been cursed, it was common  to have the curse removed by the person who had originally inflicted the curse. It was not unusual for people who resorted to cursing others to be thought of as using witchcraft.

References 

European witchcraft